Bługowo  (German Blugowo) is a village in the administrative district of Gmina Złotów. It lies within Złotów County, Greater Poland Voivodeship, in west-central Poland. 

The village has a population of 260.

References

Villages in Złotów County